Pinheyschna yemenensis is a species of dragonfly in the family Aeshnidae. It is endemic to Yemen, where its natural habitat is mountain streams above 2000 m above sea level. It is threatened by a loss of this habitat.

References

Aeshnidae
Endemic fauna of Yemen
Insects described in 1984
Taxonomy articles created by Polbot